The Gap Band III is the fifth studio album (contrary to the title) by American R&B band The Gap Band, released in 1980 on Mercury Records. It was produced by Lonnie Simmons. It was their first album to achieve platinum status. The album was remastered by PTG Records in 2009 including the radio edit of "Burn Rubber On Me (Why You Wanna Hurt Me)".

Reception

The album reached #1 on the Black Albums chart and #16 on the Billboard Hot 200. The album yielded 3 charting singles: the #60 R&B song "Humpin'", "Yearning for Your Love", a #5 R&B single which peaked at #60 on the Billboard Hot 100, and the #1 R&B hit "Burn Rubber (Why You Wanna Hurt Me)", which reached #19 on the dance charts and #84 on the Hot 100.

This would be the group's final release by Mercury Records (via Total Experience Productions). The Gap Band's next six albums were released on Total Experience Records.

Track listing

Personnel
Charlie Wilson - Keyboards, Synthesizer, Percussion, Lead and Backing Vocals
Ronnie Wilson - Trumpet, Keyboards, Backing Vocals
Robert Wilson -  Bass, Backing Vocals (Lead vocals on "Gash Gash Gash")
Oliver Scott - Horns, Keyboards, Synthesizer, Backing Vocals
Raymond Calhoun - Drums, Percussion, Backing Vocals
Melvin Webb, Ronnie Kaufman - Drums
John Black - Keyboards, Backing Vocals
Malvin "Dino" Vice - String Arrangements, Backing Vocals
Cavin Yarbrough - Synthesizer
Robert "Goodie" Whitfield - Keyboards
Fred Jenkins - Guitar
Glen Nightingale - Guitar
Marlo Henderson - Guitar
Wilmer Raglin- Horns, Backing Vocals
Earl Roberson - Horns
Katie Kilpatrick - Harp
The Gap Band, Howard Huntsberry, Jonah Ellis, Marva King, Maxanne Lewis, Rudy Taylor, Val Young, Lonnie Simmons, Malvin "Dino" Vice - Backing Vocals

Charts

Singles

See also
List of number-one R&B albums of 1981 (U.S.)

References

External links
 
 The Gap Band III at Discogs

1980 albums
The Gap Band albums
Mercury Records albums
Albums recorded at Total Experience Recording Studios